WTRB (1570 AM, "Music Country") is an American radio station licensed to serve Ripley, Tennessee in Lauderdale county. The station is presently owned by WTRB, Inc. (Palmer Johnson, President) It airs a country music format.

The station went on the air December 11, 1954 and was assigned the "WTRB" call sign by the Federal Communications Commission.

History
In March 1959, WTRB made national headlines when James W. Porter purchased fifteen minutes of air time on the station. Porter began his broadcast by shattering several records then leaving the station silent for the rest of the fifteen minutes after proposing a "National Can the Racket League" as a protest against rock'n'roll music.

Don Paris:

Don Paris started with WTRB when the station began broadcasting in 1954. Mr Paris had been the station manager until retiring in 2007 due to health reasons. Don Paris still resides in Ripley with his wife Ann.

Ownership
In September 2004, West Tennessee Regional Broadcasting Inc. (Phillip Ennis, president) announced that they had reached an agreement to acquire WTRB from Williams Communications Inc. (Walton E. Williams Jr., president/director) for a reported sale price of $265,000. In August 2009 West Tennessee Regional Broadcasting reached an agreement to sell WTRB to Palmer Johnson, a Contract Broadcast Engineer from Kennett, MO.

References

External links
WTRB official website

TRB
Country radio stations in the United States
Lauderdale County, Tennessee